No. 1303 (Meteorological) Flight was formed at RAF Ratmalana, Ceylon, on 31 July 1943 by re-designating No. 4 Meteorological Flight RAF. The flight was disbanded on 30 April 1946 at RAF Negombo, Ceylon.

Aircraft operated

Flight bases

References
Notes

Bibliography

 Delve, Ken. The Source Book of the RAF. Shrewsbury, Shropshire, UK: Airlife Publishing, 1994. .
 Lake, Alan. Flying Units of the RAF. Shrewsbury, Shropshire, UK: Airlife Publishing, 1999. .
 Sturtivant, Ray, ISO and John Hamlin. RAF Flying Training And Support Units since 1912. Tonbridge, Kent, UK: Air-Britain (Historians) Ltd., 2007. .

1303 Flight
Military units and formations established in 1943
Royal Air Force
Military units and formations of Ceylon in World War II
Military units and formations disestablished in 1946